The Third Davutoğlu Cabinet is the 64th government of the Republic of Turkey. The government came into effect after the Justice and Development Party (AKP), led by Prime Minister Ahmet Davutoğlu, won a parliamentary majority of 84 in the November 2015 general election with 317 seats in the Grand National Assembly and 49.5% of the vote.

President Recep Tayyip Erdoğan formally invited Ahmet Davutoğlu to form a government on 17 November 2015. Amid delays in the formal inauguration that were attributed to disagreements between Erdoğan and Davutoğlu on the government's composition, the government was finalised and accepted on 24 November 2015.

On 22 May 2016, Davutoğlu submitted the government's resignation on behalf of the cabinet to President Recep Tayyip Erdoğan after stepping down as leader of the AKP following reports of disagreements with Erdoğan. The cabinet continued in office until a new government was formed by Davutoğlu's successor as AKP leader, Binali Yıldırım.

Proposed structural changes
Between the election and the formal inauguration of the new government, the Ministry of Development began working on the establishment of one new government ministry and splitting six others into two. The proposals, according to the pro-government Sabah newspaper, involved a new 'Migration Ministry' to deal with the European migrant crisis.

Composition

Dissolution
The resignation of the cabinet was initially announced on 5 May 2016 by Prime Minister Ahmet Davutoğlu, who announced that he was stepping down as AKP leader and Prime Minister following a breakdown in relations with President Recep Tayyip Erdoğan. The resignation of the cabinet was formally submitted on 22 May 2016 after Binali Yıldırım was elected as Davutoğlu's successor in the 2nd AKP Extraordinary Congress and stayed in office until Yıldırım formed the 65th government of Turkey on 24 May 2016.

References

Members of the 64th government of Turkey
Davutoglu
2015 establishments in Turkey
Cabinets established in 2015
Cabinets disestablished in 2016
2016 disestablishments in Turkey